The 1980 Wyoming Cowboys football team represented the University of Wyoming in the Western Athletic Conference (WAC) during the 1980 NCAA Division I-A football season. Led led by first-year head coach Pat Dye, the Cowboys played their home games on campus at War Memorial Stadium in Laramie, Wyoming. They finished the season at 6–5 (4–4 in WAC, fifth).

Dye was previously the head coach for six years at independent East Carolina. After his only season in Laramie, he resigned a month after the season, and was hired in early January at Auburn in the Southeastern Conference.

Schedule

References

Wyoming
Wyoming Cowboys football seasons
Wyoming Cowboys football